Abbas Mirza Mosque ( (Abas Mirzayi mzkit')) was a nineteenth-century Shia mosque in Yerevan, Armenia. Abbas Mirza, in the eighteenth century, the castle was built near the mosque in Yerevan. This mosque was built at the beginning of the nineteenth century, during the reign of the last khan (governor) of the Erivan Khanate, Huseyn Khan. It was named Abbas Mirza Jami, after the Qajar crown prince Abbas Mirza, the son of Fat′h-Ali Shah. The façade of mosque was covered in green and blue glass, reflecting Persian architectural styles. After the Capture of Erivan by the Russians, the mosque was used as an arsenal.
The mosque was turned into barracks after it was conquered by Russian troops.

During the Soviet era, the mosque, along with Christian buildings, was derelict and currently only the frame of the mosque has been preserved.

Gallery

See also
 Blue Mosque, Yerevan
 Shah Abbas Mosque, Yerevan

References 

Shia mosques in Armenia
Monuments and memorials in Armenia
Armenia–Iran relations
Persian-Caucasian architecture
19th-century mosques
Mosques destroyed by communists
Closed mosques in the Soviet Union
Buildings of the Qajar period
19th-century establishments in Iran
Demolished buildings and structures in Armenia